Jordan Oesterle (born June 25, 1992) is an American professional ice hockey defenseman for  the Detroit Red Wings of the National Hockey League (NHL).

Early life
Oesterle was born on June 25, 1992, in Dearborn Heights, Michigan, U.S.

Divine Child High School located in Dearborn, MI in 2010.

Playing career

Collegiate
Undrafted, Oesterle played collegiate hockey with the Western Michigan Broncos of the NCAA National Collegiate Hockey Conference Conference, from 2010 to 2014. On March 31, 2014, Oesterle signed a two-year entry level contract with the Edmonton Oilers.

Professional career
In his rookie professional season in 2014–15 season, Oesterle was initially re-assigned to AHL affiliate, the Oklahoma City Barons. He compiled 21 points in 49 games with the Barons before he received his first NHL recall on February 20, 2015. The following day he made his NHL debut with the Oilers in a game against the Anaheim Ducks.

Chicago Blackhawks

On July 1, 2017, having left the Oilers as a free agent, Oesterle agreed to a two-year contract with the Chicago Blackhawks. He endured a slow start to the season, playing in only four of the teams' first 29 games, before joining the lineup more permanently on December 10. Upon making his debut, Oesterle played on the left hand side with Connor Murphy on the right. As the season progressed, he played alongside veteran Duncan Keith which he said improved his confidence. On December 29, 2017, Oesterle scored his first career NHL goal against Cam Talbot of his former team, the Edmonton Oilers.  As he remained on the Blackhawks roster for the entirety of the season, Oesterle established himself in a third-pairing role and recorded five goals and 10 assists over 55 games.

Arizona Coyotes
On July 12, 2018, Oesterle was traded by the Blackhawks to the Arizona Coyotes along with the contract of Marián Hossa, Vinnie Hinostroza and a 2019 third-round pick, in exchange for Marcus Krüger, Jordan Maletta, Andrew Campbell, prospect MacKenzie Entwistle, and a 2019 fifth-round draft pick. This trade cleared up $8.5 million cap space for the Blackhawks. While playing with the Coyotes during the 2018–19 season, Oesterle alternated playing alongside Oliver Ekman-Larsson on the first blue-line pair and Ilya Lyubushkin or Jakob Chychrun on the third pair. In these roles, he registered a career-best six goals and 14 assists before being signed to a two year contract through the 2020–21 season. By March, Oesterle was playing 19 minutes a night as the Coyotes fought for the second wild card spot in the Western Conference.

On October 19, 2019, Oesterle was placed on the Coyotes' long term injured reserve following an injury during a game against the Nashville Predators. He eventually re-entered the Coyotes lineup on November 9, after missing 10 games to recover.

Detroit Red Wings
On July 28, 2021, Oesterle signed a two-year $2.7 million contract with the Detroit Red Wings.

International play

Following his breakout season with the Blackhawks in 2017-18, Oesterle was added to the United States roster to make his international debut at the 2018 IIHF World Championship in Denmark. Oesterle was the United States extra defenseman at the tournament and only appeared in one game, garnering one assist, in helping claim the bronze medal.

Career statistics

Regular season and playoffs

International

References

External links

1992 births
Living people
American men's ice hockey defensemen
Arizona Coyotes players
Bakersfield Condors players
Chicago Blackhawks players
Detroit Red Wings players
Edmonton Oilers players
Ice hockey players from Michigan
Oklahoma City Barons players
People from Dearborn Heights, Michigan
Sioux Falls Stampede players
Undrafted National Hockey League players
Western Michigan Broncos men's ice hockey players